Abdul Hakeem Chowdhury (March 1924 – 28 March 1986) He is a renowned politician of Bangladesh and a member of the once elected East Pakistan Provincial Council and Member of Parliament.

Birth and family life 
Abdul Hakeem Chowdhury was born on 1 March 1924 in Dharmapasha union of Sunamganj Mohukumar of the then British Presidency of British India. His father's name is Abdur Rahman Chowdhury. His children are Rafiqul Hasan Chowdhury (eldest son) and Fakhrul Islam Chowdhury.

Political life 
Abdul Hakeem Chowdhury was a devoted colleague of Bangabandhu Sheikh Mujibur Rahman in political life. He is the president of Sunamganj District Student Federation and regional commander of the Muslim League National Guard Dharmapasha police station in the 1948. Sunamganj Mukuuma was the Vice-President of the Awami League in 1953 and co-ordinator in his own constituency in the United Front election in the 1954. He played an active role in the 1952 language movement. In 1962, Dharmapasha served as the chairman of the Union Council and a member of the former East Pakistan Provincial Legislature, and In 1963, the president of the Sunamganj Mohukuma Awami League and secretary of the then East Pakistan Awami League parliamentary party. He was elected a councilor of the then All Pakistan Awami League in that 1970 year. In 1970, he won the provincial council and won. He was elected to parliament from Sylhet-1 (now Sunamganj-1) as a Bangladesh Awami League candidate in 1973.

Death 
Abdul Hakeem Chowdhury died on 24 March 1986 while undergoing treatment at Dhaka Medical College Hospital. Later, he was buried in the Jama Masjid premises of Dharmapasha village.

See also 
 Sunamganj-1
 1973 Bangladeshi general election

References

External links 
 List of 1st Parliament Members- Jatiya Sangsad

1924 births
1986 deaths
Awami League politicians
1st Jatiya Sangsad members
People from Dharampasha Upazila